Penta is a town in Dantewada district, Chhattisgarh, India.

Geography

Location
Penta is connected to Jagdalpur by National Highway 221.

References

Nearest Airport is Hyderabad and nearest railway station head is dantewada.

External links
 About Penta

Cities and towns in Dantewada district